Liriodendrites is an extinct genus of plants, known from fossil leaves. These have a forked apex (bifurcate), like those of extant species of Liriodendron. They have been interpreted as transitional between the leaves of the extinct genus Liriophyllum and Liriodendron. The genus has been placed in the family Magnoliaceae. Five species are known: L. aeternus, L. bradacii, L. laramiense, L. occidentalis and L. sachalinensis. It has been discovered in the United States (Hell Creek Formation), Egypt (Bahariya Formation) and Russia (Sakhalin and Siberia).

References

Magnoliaceae
Cretaceous plants
Prehistoric angiosperm genera
Magnoliales genera
Fossil taxa described in 1996